Perusahaan Otobus Lorena or PO Lorena is an autobus company providing inter-city transport buses with long distance routes in Indonesia.

History 
PO Lorena was founded by GT Soerbakti in 1970 under the name CV Lorena. At the beginning of its establishment CV Lorena only had 2 bus fleets with short distance routes, namely Bogor - Jakarta PP. Long distance routes were opened by PO Lorena in 1984 starting with the route Jakarta - Surabaya PP, followed by other cities on Java, Madura, Bali and Sumatra.

Services

Inter-city buses between provinces 
PO Lorena currently has long-distance routes between Bali, Java and Sumatra,being served by a 500 bus fleet with executive and business classes on single or level bus. The routes are:

Note: All routes are round trip.

Bus Rapid Transit 
PO Lorena was an operator of TransJakarta Bus Rapid Transit from 2008 to 2018. PO Lorena had a fleet of 47 buses painted grey, consisting of 13 articulated locally made Komodo buses operated in Corridor 5 and 34 single Hino buses operated in Corridor 7. All buses were fueled with CNG.

Awards 
PO Lorena has received several awards in the field of land transportation, among other things.
 Best Land Transportation & Depot Management Award in DKI Jakarta from the Ministry of Transportation of Indonesia.
 "Golden Asia Award" For Service Excellence - Hong Kong.
 "New Millennium Award" International Transportation Award - Brussels, Belgium.
 "Lifetime Achievement Award" from Ernst & Young Entrepreneur of the Year 2003 Indonesia to the President of LORENA Group.
 Best National Autobody Company Performance Award Award from Ministry of Transportation of Indonesia
 Recipient of the Best [inter-city inter-city Bus Driver] AKAP Bus award] in DKI Jakarta and Indonesia from the Ministry of Transportation of the Republic of Indonesia.

Gallery

References

Bus companies of Indonesia